Miss Universe 1953, the 2nd Miss Universe pageant, was held on Friday July 17, at the Long Beach Municipal Auditorium in Long Beach, California, United States.  Contestants from 26 countries competed in the pageant, which was held concurrently with the Miss USA 1953 event. 17-year-old Christiane Martel from France won the competition, becoming the second Miss Universe. The previous titleholder, Armi Kuusela, resigned before her reign ended, and therefore Martel was crowned by actress Julie Adams.

Results

Placements

Special awards

Contestants 
26 contestants competed for the title.

Notes

Debuts

Withdrawals

Did not compete
  - Violet Sleigh
  - Colette Ribes

General references

References

1953
1953 beauty pageants
Beauty pageants in the United States
1953 in California
July 1953 events in the United States